The first season of New Zealand Idol was produced by Fremantle Media subsidiary Grundy Television in association with UK company 19TV, and was broadcast on TVNZ in the early half of 2004. The judges were Paul Ellis, Fiona McDonald and Frankie Stevens.

Auditions
The auditions were held at the following locations:

 Trentham Racecourse, Trentham, Upper Hutt
 Riccarton Racecourse, Riccarton, Christchurch
 Ellerslie Racecourse, Ellerslie, Auckland

Those who were successful would proceed to the "Top 60" theatre rounds held at the Maidment Theatre in Auckland.

Theatre Week
The successful contestants who made it through to the "Top 60" rounds would spend a gruelling three days at the theatre.

 Day One: Contestants, in groups of six, were to sing in turn, a cappella, a song of their own choice. At the end of the day, twelve were sent home, leaving 48 remaining.
Eliminated: Faith, Petia, Darryl, Kasanita, Ria, George, Dominic, Naomi, Charli, Hiwi, Ruth, Matthew

 Day Two: Trio performances would test the contestants' teamwork skills, with the guys performing Elvis Presley's "Suspicious Minds", while the girls would perform the Burt Bacharach classic "I Say a Little Prayer."  At the end of this, the group was once more reduced by a further 12.
Eliminated: Jazmine, Conrad, Pairama, Wiremu, James, Krista, Rebekah, Daniel, Chantel, Jessica, Katherine, Clarke

 Day Three: The remaining 36 contestants have one last opportunity to impress the judges. Once again they were to perform solo, (a cappella), in front of the judges and all other remaining contestants.
Eliminated: TJ, Liam, Courtenay, Ian, Maisey, Rochelle, Akina, Toni, Rusila, Pania, Sacha, Paranihia

The decision of the final cut to the "Top 24" was delivered to three groups of twelve, with one group being sent home.

Semi-finals

Group 1

 Nigel Withington – "Right Here Waiting" by Richard Marx
 Christine Hutt – "Think Twice" by Celine Dion
 Camillia Temple – "Exhale (Shoop Shoop)" by Whitney Houston
 Karly Ryder – "Not That Kind" by Anastacia

 Faaose "Oz" Aneru – "Against All Odds" by Phil Collins
 Ben Lummis – "Back at One" by Brian McKnight
 Emily Kay – "Respect" by Aretha Franklin
 Filipo Saipani – "Still" by Brian McKnight

Advancing to the Top 10: Camillia Temple, Ben Lummis and Filipo Saipani
Wildcard Contender: Nigel Withington

Group 2

 Ngahekenga Growcott – "The Voice Within" by Christina Aguilera
 Gemma Russell – "Ain't No Mountain High Enough" by Marvin Gaye & Tammi Terrell
 Inangaro Tangianau – "Everything Is Everything" by Lauryn Hill
 Sam Cowley-Lupo – "Unchained Melody" by The Righteous Brothers

 Jessie Cassin – "Angel" by Sarah McLachlan
 Luke Whaanga – "The Greatest Love of All" by Whitney Houston
 Dave Houma – "Yesterday Once More" by The Carpenters
 Michael Murphy – "Drive" by Incubus

Advancing to the Top 10: Luke Whaanga, Dave Houma and Michael Murphy
Wildcard Contender: Jessie Cassin

Group 3

 Alana Plews – "Come On Over" by Christina Aguilera
 Robin Johnson – "Ribbon in the Sky" by Stevie Wonder
 Amanda Boyce – "Because You Loved Me" by Celine Dion
 Lee Fidow – "Incomplete" by Sisqó

 Lemuel Misa – "Every Time I Close My Eyes" by Babyface / Backstreet Boys
 Sela Mahe – "How Come You Don't Call Me?" by Alicia Keys
 Ariana Roberts – "You Don't Know My Name" by Alicia Keys
 Eddie Gaiger – "Drift Away" by Dobie Gray

Advancing to the Top 10: Robin Johnson, Sela Mahe and Eddie Gaiger
Wildcard Contender: Amanda Boyce

Wildcards
 Nigel Withington – "Lady in Red" by Chris de Burgh
 Jessie Cassin – "Something Good" by Bic Runga
 Amanda Boyce – "Amazing Grace"

Advancing to the Top 10: Jessie Cassin

Weekly Song Themes

The Top 10 Finalists

Ben Lummis

Ben Lummis (born 1 June 1978 in Wellington) was the winner of the first series of New Zealand Idol.

Audition: "Back at One" by Brian McKnight
Theatre Week (Round 1): "I Believe I Can Fly" by R. Kelly
Theatre Week (Round 3): "The Day" by Babyface
Top 24: "Back at One" by Brian McKnight
Top 10: "Never Too Much" by Luther Vandross
Top 9: "Oughta Be in Love" by Dave Dobbyn
Top 8: "Hang On in There Baby" by Johnny Bristol
Top 7: "I Can Love You Like That" by All-4-One
Top 6: "Kiss from a Rose" by Seal
Top 5: "Treat Her Like a Lady" by The Temptations
Top 4: "American Woman" by Lenny Kravitz, "Livin' on a Prayer" by Bon Jovi
Top 3: "The Power of Love" by Huey Lewis and the News, "Rhythm of the Night" by DeBarge
Top 2: "Kiss from a Rose" by Seal, "Livin' on a Prayer" by Bon Jovi, "I Believe I Can Fly" by R. Kelly , "They Can't Take That Away" (Winner's single)

Michael Murphy

Michael Murphy (born 4 September 1986 in Taupo), was runner-up to winner Ben Lummis.

Audition: "Don't Dream It's Over" by Crowded House
Theatre Week (Round 1): "Drive" by Incubus
Theatre Week (Round 3): "Better Be Home Soon" by Crowded House
Top 24: "Drive" by Incubus
Top 10: "Here Without You" by 3 Doors Down
Top 9: "Better Be Home Soon" by Crowded House
Top 8: "Play That Funky Music" by Wild Cherry
Top 7: "Tears in Heaven" by Eric Clapton
Top 6: "Let Me Entertain You" by Robbie Williams
Top 5: "(Sittin' On) The Dock of the Bay" by Otis Redding
Top 4: "Rock and Roll" by Led Zeppelin, "Wherever You Will Go" by The Calling
Top 3: "Should I Stay or Should I Go" by The Clash, "Angel of Harlem" by U2
Top 2: "Let Me Entertain You" by Robbie Williams, "Tears in Heaven" by Eric Clapton, "One" by U2, "They Can't Take That Away" (Winner's single)

Camillia Temple
Camillia Temple (aged 28, from Hamilton), came third.

Audition: "My Love Is Your Love" by Whitney Houston
Theatre Week (Round 1): "How Come You Don't Call Me?" by Alicia Keys
Theatre Week (Round 3): "Bohemian Rhapsody" by Queen
Top 24: "Exhale (Shoop Shoop)" by Whitney Houston
Top 10: "Natural Woman" by Aretha Franklin
Top 9:  "Escaping" by Margaret Urlich
Top 8: "Lady Marmalade" by Labelle
Top 7: "Purple Rain" by Prince
Top 6: "Superstar" by Jamelia
Top 5: "Piece of My Heart" by Janis Joplin
Top 4: "Alone" by Heart, "Black Velvet" by Alannah Myles
Top 3: "I Want to Know What Love Is" by Foreigner, "How Will I Know" by Whitney Houston

Luke Whaanga
Luke Whaanga, (aged 20, from Lower Hutt), was placed fourth.

Audition: "I Love Every Little Thing About You" by Stevie Wonder
Theatre Week (Round 1): "A Whole New World" by Peabo Bryson and Regina Belle
Theatre Week (Round 3): "If I Had No Loot" by Tony! Toni! Toné!
Top 24: "The Greatest Love of All" by Whitney Houston
Top 10: "Slippin' Away" by Max Merritt
Top 9: "Sitting Inside My Head" by Supergroove
Top 8: "You to Me Are Everything" by The Real Thing
Top 7: "When A Man Loves A Woman" by Percy Sledge
Top 6: "Come Together" by The Beatles
Top 5: "Shining Star" by The Manhattans
Top 4: "Behind Blue Eyes" by Limp Bizkit, "You Shook Me All Night Long" by AC/DC

Dave Houma
Dave Houma (aged 28, from Auckland), finished in fifth place.

Audition: "Yesterday Once More" by The Carpenters
Theatre Week (Round 1): "Hard to Say I'm Sorry" by Chicago
Theatre Week (Round 3): "Love X Love" by George Benson
Top 24: "Yesterday Once More" by The Carpenters
Top 10: "Hard to Find Her" by Zed
Top 9: "Better" by Brooke Fraser
Top 8: "Give Me the Night" by George Benson
Top 7: "Truly" by Lionel Richie
Top 6: "Empty Garden (Hey Hey Johnny)" by Elton John
Top 5: "Reach Out (I'll Be There)" by The Four Tops

Eddie Gaiger
Eddie Gaiger (aged 25, from the Coromandel), was placed sixth.

Audition: "Don't Dream It's Over" by Crowded House
Theatre Week (Round 1): "Oughta Be in Love" by Dave Dobbyn
Theatre Week (Round 3): "Burn for You" by John Farnham
Top 24: "Drift Away" by Dobie Gray
Top 10: "One Last Breath" by Creed
Top 9:  "Misty Frequencies" by Che Fu
Top 8: "Superstition" by Stevie Wonder
Top 7: "Against All Odds" by Phil Collins
Top 6: "Somebody To Love" by Queen

Robin Johnson
Robin Johnson (aged 18, from Upper Hutt), finished in seventh place.

Audition: "Man of the Hour" by John Farnham
Theatre Week (Round 1): "Ain't Too Proud to Beg" by The Temptations
Theatre Week (Round 3): "Kiss" by Prince
Top 24: "Ribbon in the Sky" by Stevie Wonder
Top 10: "Cry Me A River" by Justin Timberlake
Top 9: "Don't Dream It's Over" by Crowded House
Top 8: "Blame It on the Boogie" by The Jackson 5
Top 7: "I'll Be There" by Mariah Carey

Jessie Cassin
Jessie Cassin (aged 18, from Browns Bay, Auckland), placed eighth. Prior to Idol, Jessie was completing a Bachelor of Music, majoring in Performance Music – Classical.

Audition: "Drive" by Bic Runga
Theatre Week (Round 1): "Songbird" by Eva Cassidy
Theatre Week (Round 3): "The Greatest Love of All" by Whitney Houston
Top 24: "Angel" by Sarah McLachlan
Wildcards: "Something Good" by Bic Runga
Top 10: "Something Good" by Bic Runga
Top 9: "I Hope I Never" by Split Enz
Top 8: "Dancing Queen" by Abba

Sela Mahe
Sela Mahe (aged 17, from Mangere, Auckland), finished ninth. She is of Tongan descent.

Audition: "It's Only a Paper Moon" by Natalie Cole
Theatre Week (Round 1):
Theatre Week (Round 3): "It's Only a Paper Moon" by Natalie Cole
Top 24: "How Come You Don't Call Me?" by Alicia Keys
Top 10: "Gettin' In The Way" by Jill Scott
Top 9:  "Time Makes A Wine" by Ardijah

Filipo Saipani
Filipo Saipani (aged 18, from Wellington), was placed tenth.

Audition: "God Defend New Zealand"
Theatre Week (Round 1): "Whenever You Call" by Brian McKnight
Theatre Week (Round 3): "I'll Be There" by The Jackson 5
Top 24: "Still" by Brian McKnight
Top 10: "Whenever You Call" by Brian McKnight

The Grand Final
The final was held on 10 May, with the following performances:

 The Top 10: "Kids" by Robbie Williams and Kylie Minogue
 Luke Whaanga: "Sitting Inside My Head" by Supergroove
 Ben Lummis: "They Can't Take That Away" (winner's single)
 Eddie Gaiger: "Somebody To Love" by Queen
 Camillia Temple: "Purple Rain" by Prince
 Michael Murphy: "They Can't Take That Away" (winner's single)
 Jessie Cassin: "Drive" by Bic Runga
 Fiona McDonald & Frankie Stevens: "Somethin' Stupid" by Frank Sinatra and Nancy Sinatra
 Robin Johnson: "Cry Me A River" by Justin Timberlake
 Filipo Saipani: "Whenever You Call" by Brian McKnight
 Sela Mahe: "How Come You Don't Call Me?" by Alicia Keys
 Michael Murphy: "Wherever You Will Go" by The Calling
 Ben Lummis: "American Woman" by Lenny Kravitz
 Dave Houma: "Empty Garden (Hey Hey Johnny)" by Elton John
 Ben Lummis: "They Can't Take That Away"

Elimination chart

Commercial Releases

References

External links
 Official New Zealand Idol website

New Zealand Idol
2004 New Zealand television seasons